

First Korean Movie Theatres

Danseongsa (단성사) 
The emergence of Korean Movie Theatre Culture began in 1907 when Danseongsa – the first movie theatre in the country – opened its doors. The cultural complex was not limited to only film and theatre productions but also Korean traditional sports such as Ssireum were held at the facility.

Umigwan (우미관) 
Umigwan was another movie theatre that opened during this time. This theatre was capable of playing imported movies from France because of the facility having up-to-date video equipment.

Movie Theatre Culture During the Japanese Occupation 
In the late 1910s South Korea was a colony of Japan and there were protests and resistance against Japan. After Hollywood movies were imported, theatres were separated by language due to the Joseon Dynasty being under the Japanese Occupation. As movie theatres were divided by language, Japanese audiences went to Namchon to watch movies, whereas Korean audiences went to Bukchon.

The theatre was a hidden place where protestors came to plan for resistance. The theatre naturally began to be recognized by the public as a cultural and political space to fight with colonial rule. Under these circumstances, the theatre was utilized by protestors as a tool for the independence movement. For instance, street demonstrations were difficult due to the Japanese military, so instead, audiences in Danseongsa and Umiguwan shouted "Independence of Korea" during film screening as a form of protest. Another instance took place on December 13, 1929 at the Chosun Theatre when Kim Moo-sam, secretary of the Joseon Ilbo (조선일보), was arrested for reading the Declaration about the Gwangju student incident during a film screening. Since the rise of independence movements in theatres, the Governor-General's Office has frequently interrupted to run theatres.

Moviegoing After the Liberation from Japan 
The implementation of civilian rule and the Korean War have had a significant impact on the film industry. Shortly after the Korean War had ended, filmmaking in Korea was put into a disadvantage due to technical problems and lack of capital. As a result, most shows put on were Hollywood films and original theatre productions. During this time, Korean theatres were held stage performing and films. This was the start of Korean Opera (Changgeuk (창극)).

The Peak and Decline of Moviegoing in South Korea

1960s 
Korean films and theatres thrived during the 1960s. The most favoured entertainment in 1962 became film and most influential media outlets, with a 34.8% increase of audience members.

1970s 
Once television became widespread, the number of Korean moviegoers started to decline during the early 1970s. In addition, film policies became more strict in the nation and as a result became the downturn of the film industry. The slump continued during the late 1970s, which generated a genre with provocative content involving hostesses. This type of genre became popular among the young audiences during the time.

1980s 
The movie industry was still thriving amongst the young demographic. However, the genre preference was divided into two groups and was significantly based on the level of academics and economic backgrounds. New movies was what attracted the higher educated group, whereas the middle to low educated group went for the re-runs and the lower quality screenings. The young, high class population grew up in the city and were used to American culture. On the other hand, the lower classes who came from rural areas, had low academic and economic standards and favoured Korean films more than American films.

1990s (The Decline of Small Movie Theatres) 
Small theatres in Korea began to decrease once it reached the beginning of the ‘90s. Small business owners were at an advantage because they could screen films at a cheap rate, however, many were going out of business because they can no longer afford to replace the outdated technology. Meanwhile, the successful theatres eventually expanded through the help of strong financial support. During this time, instead of large theatres, complexes started to gain the interest of the people. These complexes were a collaboration between small and medium theatres, along with many entertainment facilities. The characteristic that attracted these large audiences was its ability to show a variety of films and providing activities all in one space.

Movie Theatres in South Korea Today 
More multiplexes with movie theatres, shopping centres and restaurants emerged in the country entering in the 21st century and as a result, the film industry was revived. Many changes and new additions were made in addition to movie theatre culture. One of them is that audiences are now able to enjoy leisure activities as they wait for the next screening time. In addition, as a result of technological advancements, movie films have become more engaging with the introduction of 3D and 4D movies that provide audiences with a more realistic experience. Lastly, movie theatres in Korea have pursued to increase the level of the comfort while watching movies and since then has divided itself into different types of theatre facilities. For example, the cinema CGV collaborated with mattress brand, Temper Korea and opened bed theatres "Tempur Cinema" at CGV in the Apgujeong and Centum City branches.

References